This is a list of flags used in Costa Rica. For more information about the national flag, visit the article Flag of Costa Rica.

National Flags

Provinces

Cantons

Historical flags

Flag Proposal

Political flags

Sources 
The Flags of Costa Rica. Flags of the World
 National symbols of Chile. Museums of Costa Rica 

Costa Rica
Flags
Flags